Power Grid is the English-language version of the second edition of the multiplayer German-style board game Funkenschlag, designed by Friedemann Friese and first released in 2004. Power Grid was released by Rio Grande Games.

In the game, each player represents a company which owns power plants and tries to supply electricity to cities. During the game, players bid on power plants and buy resources to provide electricity to the growing number of cities in their network.

Background
Power Grid was developed from Funkenschlag, the original game, which had players draw their networks with crayons instead of playing on a fixed map. This and other changes were made when Friedemann Friese reworked the game. The new game is called Funkenschlag in the German market, but is sold under other names elsewhere.

Game play

The game comes with a double-sided board with a map of the United States on one side and Germany on the other. Each map has six regions, containing cities with connections of various costs between them. The number of regions used is based on the number of players. The map is a key strategic component, since some areas have generally higher connection costs than others.

Power Grid is played in rounds. Each round has five phases:

 

The game ends when one player builds a fixed number of cities, and the winner is the player who can supply electricity to the most cities with his network. In case of a tie, the player with the most money wins. If that results in a tie, the player with the most cities is the winner.

Power Grid is further divided into three steps. In step one eight power plants are visible to players, arranged in two rows of four based on reverse value. The first row (the least- valuable plants) is available for bidding. Only the first slot of a city may be connected. Step two begins when a player builds a set number of cities, determined by the number of players. The least-valuable available plant is removed from the game, and the second city slots are available for connection. Step three begins when the step-three card comes up in the power-plant deck after being initially placed at the bottom of the deck, and the least-valuable available plant is removed from the game. The available-power-plant pool is down to six, and the remaining-power-plant deck is shuffled to make a new draw deck.

Editions
Power Grid is available under different names in different markets. Most have the same game play, but a few editions are slightly different because they have non-standard maps.

Expansions
All expansions require the original game.

Spin-offs
These are stand-alone games:

Reception
According to Martin Wallace, "I cannot say the game is definitively a classic. What I do know is that it still gets played regularly around the U.K. games scene. The vast majority of board games get dragged out once or twice and are then chucked to one side to collect dust until either auctioned or hidden in the loft by the better half. Power Grid has hung around because it has that certain something about it that makes you happy to sit down and play a game".

Reviews
Pyramid

References

External links
 Rio Grande Games' Power Grid webpage
 
 
 
 PowerGrid review at The Games Journal

Board games introduced in 2004
Economic simulation board games
Multiplayer games
Rio Grande Games games